Warehouse 13  is an American science fiction television series that originally ran from July 7, 2009, to May 19, 2014, on the Syfy network, and was executive produced by Jack Kenny and David Simkins for Universal Cable Productions. Described as "part The X-Files, part Raiders of the Lost Ark and part Moonlighting", the show's blend of science fiction, comedy and drama is said to have borrowed much from the American-Canadian horror television series Friday the 13th: The Series (1987–1990). The program follows a team of field agents who retrieve artifacts that have become charged with energy that can give them dangerous powers if misused. Once retrieved and neutralized, the objects are stored in Warehouse 13, the latest in a line of storehouses with infinite capacity that have served this purpose for millennia.

Plot 
The series follows U.S. Secret Service Agents Myka Bering (Joanne Kelly) and Pete Lattimer (Eddie McClintock) when they are assigned to the secretive Warehouse 13 for supernatural artifacts. It is located in a barren landscape in South Dakota, and they initially regard the assignment as punishment. As they go about their assignments to retrieve missing artifacts and investigate reports of new ones, they come to understand the importance of what they are doing. In episode 4 of the first season, they meet Claudia Donovan (Allison Scagliotti), who is searching for her missing brother; in season 2, she joins the team as their technology expert. In episode 1 of season 3, Steve Jinks (Aaron Ashmore), an Agent from the Bureau of Alcohol, Tobacco, Firearms and Explosives comes aboard.

Fictional history 

The series posits that there have been a dozen incarnations of the warehouse before the present-day 13th in South Dakota. Warehouse 1 was built between 336 and 323 BC on the orders of Alexander the Great as a place to keep artifacts obtained by war. After Alexander died, the warehouse was moved to Egypt, establishing the practice of locating the warehouse in the most powerful empire of the day, under the reasoning that it will be best defended there. Egypt's Ptolemaic rulers appointed a group of people, known as the Regents, to oversee the warehouse and act as its first "agents" and collectors of artifacts. Warehouse 2 lasted until the Roman conquest of Egypt. Other warehouses throughout history include: Warehouse 3 in Western Roman Empire (Italy), Warehouse 4 in Hunnic Empire until the death of Attila the Hun, Warehouse 5 in Byzantine Empire, Warehouse 6 in Cambodia under the Khmer Empire, Warehouse 7 in the Mongol Empire under Genghis Khan, Warehouse 8 in Germany during the Holy Roman Empire (1260–1517), Warehouse 9 in the Ottoman capital of Constantinople until the death of Suleiman the Magnificent, Warehouse 10 in Mughal Empire (India), Warehouse 11 in the Russian Empire under the Romanov Dynasty (the 1812 Napoleonic War with Russia was an attempt to seize control of Warehouse 11), and Warehouse 12 in the United Kingdom from 1830 until 1914. It was during the time of Warehouse 11 that the Regents began to employ agents to gather and protect artifacts. This practice continued under Warehouse 12, with British agents traveling further and further searching for artifacts to add to the collection.

The next move brought the warehouse to South Dakota in the United States. Unlike previous warehouses, which were placed in the centers of their empires, Warehouse 13 was located in a remote area of South Dakota to hide it. The first Warehouse 13 was built in 1898, but the structure burned down because of an insufficient understanding of how to safely store artifacts. The move to the rebuilt and current Warehouse 13 occurred in 1914 at the onset of World War I. The warehouse was designed by Thomas Edison, Nikola Tesla, and M. C. Escher, while the warehouse's expansion joints were created by Albert Einstein.

Artifacts and gadgets 
Originally, artifacts are items connected to some historical or mythological figure or event. Each artifact has been imbued with something from its creator, user, or a major event in history. Some are well known: Studio 54's Disco ball; Lewis Carroll's looking glass, which contains an evil entity called "Alice" that can possess other people's bodies (Myka in Season 1 episode "Duped"), leaving their minds trapped in the mirror; and Edgar Allan Poe's pen and a volume of his writing, which can make whatever the user writes a reality. Some are not: Lizzie Borden had a mirrored compact that today compels users to kill their loved ones with an axe; Marilyn Monroe owned a brush that now turns its user's hair platinum blonde, which Myka once used on herself while under the influence of W. C. Fields' juggling balls that induce drunkenness and blackouts. Others may have humorous effects, such as Ivan Pavlov's bell, which will call any dog to you but causes excessive drooling for 24 hours, and a magic kettle that grants wishes but produces a ferret if the wish is impossible. The artifacts react with electricity and can be neutralized by immersion in a mysterious purple goo or placed inside a neutralizing reflective bag, both produced by Global Dynamics, a research laboratory from Warehouse 13s sister show, Eureka. Artie has also mentioned that ingesting neutralizer will make you "see things". During episode 43 (season 4), Mrs. Frederic shows Claudia an artifact being created—a silver bracelet worn by an ordinary person who exhibits extraordinary courage.

Cast and characters

Warehouse agents are provided by the host country of the warehouse, in this case from various government agencies (such as the Secret Service, FBI, ATF, CDC, and DEA, etc.). Agents of Warehouse 13 in particular were chosen either for their above-average intelligence (Artie is an expert NSA codebreaker, Myka has an eidetic memory and a wealth of encyclopedic knowledge, Claudia and H.G. Wells are both expert inventors) or because they possess a kind of extranormal ability (Pete and Mrs. Frederic both receive "vibes" regarding situations; Leena can read people's auras; and Jinks has the ability to tell when a person is lying).

Main

 Eddie McClintock as Pete Lattimer is a "rule-bender" Secret Service Agent, now assigned to Warehouse 13. He has been able to pick up "vibes", both good and bad, since he was a child. The series frequently makes references to his being a recovering alcoholic who already had been sober for more than eight years when the series started. He is also fond of cookies.
 Joanne Kelly as Myka Bering, once a rising star in the Secret Service, is a by-the-book agent. She has a scrupulous eye for detail and possesses an eidetic memory. She also has extensive knowledge of books, having grown up in a book store. Reference to a former partner that ended in tragedy is frequently made, such as in the season one episode "Regrets".
 Saul Rubinek as Artie Nielsen is the Special Agent in Charge at Warehouse 13. A former cryptographer and codebreaker for the NSA, he has spent over 30 years at the Warehouse and is very knowledgeable about artifacts, both in the Warehouse and out in the world. He becomes a surrogate father to Claudia.
 Genelle Williams as Leena (seasons 1–4; guest season 5), the proprietor of the bed and breakfast in nearby Univille, where the team lives. She can read a person's aura.

 Simon Reynolds as Daniel Dickinson (season 1; guest season 2), Pete and Myka's former boss in Washington, D.C.

 Allison Scagliotti as Claudia Donovan (seasons 2–5; recurring season 1) is described as a "young, hip, brilliant techno-wiz" who earns a job at Warehouse 13 after discovering too many of its secrets. She can hack into almost any computer network and occasionally modifies artifacts to suit her needs. (This does not always end well.)
 Aaron Ashmore as Steve Jinks (seasons 4–5; recurring season 3)  was an ATF agent before being recruited to Warehouse 13 for his ability to tell when people are lying. In "Emily Lake", he is killed by Marcus Diamond (Sasha Roiz) on orders of Walter Sykes (Anthony Michael Hall). In season 4, he is resurrected by Claudia using the metronome. Ashmore was promoted to series regular beginning with the episode "Personal Effects".

Recurring
 CCH Pounder as Irene Frederic
 Roger Rees as James MacPherson (seasons 1–4)
 Mark A. Sheppard as Benedict Valda (season 2; guest seasons 1 & 5)
 René Auberjonois as Hugo Miller (season 2–5)
 Jaime Murray as Helena G. Wells (seasons 2–5)
 Paula Garcés as Kelly Hernandez (season 2; guest season 5)
 Nolan Gerard Funk as Todd (season 2)
 Faran Tahir as Adwin Kosan (seasons 3–4; guest season 2)
 Kate Mulgrew as Jane Lattimer (seasons 3–4)
 Ashley Williams as Sally Stukowski (season 3)
 Sasha Roiz as Marcus Diamond (seasons 3–4)
 Brent Spiner as Brother Adrian (seasons 3–4)
 Lindsay Wagner as Dr. Vanessa Calder (seasons 4–5; guest seasons 2–3)
 Kelly Hu as Abigail Cho (seasons 4–5)
 Josh Blaylock as Nick Powell (season 4)
 Chryssie Whitehead as Claire Donovan (season 5)
 Erick Avari as Caturanga (guest seasons 3 & 5)
 Anthony Michael Hall as Walter Sykes (season 3)
 Jeri Ryan as Amanda Lattimer (guest seasons 3–4)

Production 
The network, then named SciFi, originally ordered a two-hour pilot episode written by Farscape creator Rockne S. O'Bannon, Battlestar Galactica co-Executive Producer Jane Espenson, and D. Brent Mote. Jace Alexander eventually directed a revised version written by Espenson, Mote, and Blade: The Series executive producer David Simkins. SciFi ordered an additional nine episodes on September 19, 2008. The series premiered in the U.S. on July 7, 2009 concurrent with the name-change to Syfy. Executive Producer Jack Kenny, Creator "Book of Daniel","Titus", took over showrunning duties beginning with Episode 2, and continued to run the series for its duration of 63 episodes.  The series was filmed in and around Toronto, Ontario.

Crossovers

Character crossovers 
Warehouse 13 was part of Syfy's developing shared fictional universe, with several characters crossing over between series:
 Global Dynamics researcher Douglas Fargo (played by Neil Grayston) from Eureka traveled to South Dakota to update Warehouse 13's computer system in the Warehouse 13 episode "13.1" (S2E5). Warehouse 13 computer wizard Claudia Donovan (played by Allison Scagliotti) subsequently traveled to the town of Eureka, Oregon to check out the technological marvels at Global Dynamics in the Eureka episode "Crossing Over" (its S4E5). Fargo again appeared in the Warehouse 13 episode "Don't Hate the Player" (S3E6) when Claudia, Lattimer, and Bering traveled to Palo Alto, California, to find Douglas beta testing a virtual reality simulator with the aid of a dangerous artifact.
 Dr. Vanessa Calder (played by Lindsay Wagner), who appeared in the Warehouse 13 episodes "For the Team" (S2E7), "Buried" (S2E11), "Love Sick" (S3E3) and "Endless Terror" (S5E1) as a physician and love interest of Artie, traveled to Fenton, Pennsylvania, to investigate a series of deaths in which the victims suffered massive organ failures in the Alphas episode "Never Let Me Go" (its S1E5).
 Hugo Miller spent some time in the town of Eureka, departing with Douglas Fargo at the end of episode "13.1"; he returns in "Love Sick", commenting that, "every week [there] something seems to go 'boom'!" His presence there is off screen.

Actor crossovers 
Warehouse 13 did import characters from other TV series, but would often cast pairs of actors who had worked together on other series as single-episode characters.
 Erica Cerra and Niall Matter who work together on Eureka played a couple with an artifact in "Duped" (S1E8).
 Joe Morton who also works on Eureka played an inmate in "Regrets" (S1E9).
 Sean Maher and Jewel Staite who worked together on Firefly played an almost-couple in "Mild Mannered" (S2E2).
 Paula Garcés and Laura Harris who worked together on Defying Gravity were both cast members in "Merge with Caution" (S2E8).
 Before this, Garcés first appeared in "Beyond Our Control" (S2E3).
 Sasha Roiz and Alessandra Torresani who were cast members in Caprica were both cast members in "Shadows" (S3E9).
 Before this, Roiz first appeared in "Love Sick" (S3E3).
 Kirsten Nelson and Timothy Omundson who worked together on Psych were both cast in "No Pain, No Gain" (S4E5).
 Missi Pyle and Enrico Colantoni who were cast members in Galaxy Quest were together in "The Big Snag" (S4E13).
 Josh Blaylock and Cynthia Watros who worked together on Video Game High School were featured separately in "What Matters Most" (S4E17).
 James Marsters and Anthony Stewart Head who were both in Buffy the Vampire Slayer were also together in "All the Time in the World" (S4E19) and "The Truth Hurts" (S4E20).
 Ryan Cartwright and Erin Way who worked together on Alphas were cast together in the third episode of the final season: "A Faire to Remember" (S5E3).

Reception 
The series premiere was Syfy's third largest debut to date, garnering 3.5 million viewers. The first six episodes were all among the top ten highest rated series episodes on Syfy. Episode 6, "Burnout", drew 4.4 million viewers, setting the record for Syfy's highest rated show. Season 2 began July 6, 2010. It was renewed October 5, 2010, for a third season of 13 episodes, which began July 11, 2011. It was renewed for a fourth season August 11, 2011, which began July 23, 2012. On May 16, 2013, Syfy renewed the series for a six-episode fifth and final season, which aired its series finale on May 19, 2014.

Warehouse 13 series premiere was the most-watched cable show on American television that night. With 3.5 million viewers, it was also Syfy's third best premiere ever, behind Stargate Atlantis (2004) and Eureka (2006).

Joanne Ostrow of The Denver Post described it as "X-Files light, with the bickering Scully and Mulder stand-ins going off on Indiana Jones-style adventures." IGN reviewer Ramsey Isler gave the pilot a positive review, but felt that it was not enough to give Syfy "a chance to once again boast the best sci-fi show on TV."

Ken Tucker of Entertainment Weekly gave it a negative review in July 2009, describing it as an "unholy cross between The X-Files, Bones, and Raiders of the Lost Ark." In July 2010, Tucker amended his opinion, stating that "Warehouse improved as it went along" and "grew more riveting"; he subsequently gave the show a rating of "B".

In 2010, the series' composer, Edward Rogers, was nominated for an Emmy Award for Best Original Main Title Theme Music.

Warehouse 13 has received seven 2012 Portal Award nominations, including best television series, best actor (Eddie McClintock), best actress (Joanne Kelly), best supporting actor (Saul Rubinek), best supporting actress (Allison Scagliotti), best special guest (Jaime Murray as Helena G. Wells), and best episode ("Emily Lake"). It was Eddie McClintock's third straight nomination and the second nomination for Saul Rubinek and Allison Scagliotti.

As of September 2020, Warehouse 13 scored 82 percent among all critics (60 percent among top critics) and 87 percent with audience members on Rotten Tomatoes.

Episodes

Home media

DVD release

Streaming
All five seasons of Warehouse 13 are now available on Peacock. Individual episodes can be purchased at the Google Play Store, Apple TV+, Vudu, iTunes, Amazon Prime Video, Fandango Now.

In other media

Comics 
The first part of a five-part comic series was released in August 2011 by Dynamite Entertainment with part five released in December 2011. A trade paperback was released in May 2012 containing all five parts.

Novels

Games 
In August 2016, Infinite Dreams Gaming and Conquest Gaming announced Warehouse 13: The Board Game coming to Kickstarter. It is a semi-cooperative game for 3-5 players taking the role of Warehouse Agents with one player working secretly against the Warehouse. Agents must work together trying to retrieve artifacts while uncovering the identity of the traitor.

See also

 The Librarian
 SCP Foundation

References

External links 

  (Dead Link)
 

 
2000s American science fiction television series
2009 American television series debuts
2010s American science fiction television series
2014 American television series endings
American adventure television series
English-language television shows
Fictional government investigations of the paranormal
Syfy original programming
Television shows filmed in Toronto
Television series by Universal Content Productions
Serial drama television series
Television shows set in South Dakota
Treasure hunt television series